Diary of a Mad Black Woman is a 2005 American romantic comedy drama film directed by Darren Grant and written by Tyler Perry. Inspired by the play of the same name, it marks the debut feature film of Perry, in addition to being the first entry in the Madea film franchise. The film stars Perry alongside Kimberly Elise, Steve Harris, Shemar Moore, and Cicely Tyson. The film tells the story of a woman who is thrown out of her house by her husband on their 18th wedding anniversary as she moves in with her grandmother. This was the only Tyler Perry scripted film not to be directed by Tyler Perry.

Filming began on July 21, 2004 in Atlanta and Fairburn, Georgia. Diary of a Mad Black Woman was released theatrically by Lionsgate Films on February 25, 2005. The film received mostly negative reviews from critics, but it was a box office success, having grossed $50.7 million worldwide against a $5.5 million budget.

The sequel, Madea's Family Reunion, was released on February 24, 2006.

Plot

Helen Simmons-McCarter and her attorney husband Charles McCarter have money, success, and a fine home. Despite seemingly perfect lives, Charles is actually distant, verbally and physically abusive, and has been having multiple affairs, while Helen is unemployed, bored at home, and desperately trying to make her marriage work.

On the evening of their 18th wedding anniversary, Helen arrives home to find all her belongings in a U-Haul, and that Charles is abandoning her for his young mistress Brenda, the mother of his two sons.

Helen kicks the driver Orlando out of the truck and visits her intimidating grandmother Madea. Madea takes Helen in and helps her get back on her feet, upsetting Madea's brother Joe. Joe's attorney son Brian defends Madea and Helen after Charles and Brenda catch the pair breaking into and vandalizing the marital home. Judge Mablean Ephriam places Madea, a repeat offender, under house arrest and sets a $5,000 property or cash bond for Helen.

Brian kicks his addict wife Debrah out of their home, causing him to have a strained relationship with their daughter Tiffany who wants to join the church choir. Fearing that Tiffany will turn to drugs like her mother, Brian refuses until Madea convinces him otherwise, encouraging him to also fix his relationship with Debrah. Helen cultivates a relationship with Orlando. Meanwhile, career criminal Jamison Milton Jackson asks Charles to defend him in his trial for shooting an undercover cop during a drug deal and to possibly bribe the judge $300,000 to rule in his favor, revealing that Charles received most of his money through drug deals and buying off judges.

In divorce court, Helen lets Charles keep all the money and property, provided he pay Brian's attorney fees and continue paying for her mother Myrtle Jean's stay in a nursing home since he made her place her there; Charles agrees to both terms. In the shooting case, despite Charles' efforts, the jury convicts Jamison. While being led out of the courtroom, Jamison snatches the bailiff's gun and shoots Charles in the back for failing to get him acquitted.

Orlando proposes to Helen. Before she can respond, she sees the shooting on the news and goes to the hospital with Brian. They encounter Brenda upon arriving. The doctor says Charles might be permanently paralyzed  and asks if they should resuscitate him if things deteriorate. Brenda chooses to let Charles die, but Helen, still Charles's legal wife, tells the doctor to do everything possible for him.

Charles recovers, returns home with Helen, and resumes verbally abusing her, but Helen takes the opportunity to retaliate for years of neglect, verbal, emotional, and physical abuse by not only physically humiliating him, but also by revealing that Brenda finally showed her true colors by not only opting to let Charles die, but also by emptying his bank account and leaving with their boys during his hospitalization. She additionally reveals that their housekeeper Christina has left as well because Charles has no money to pay her, and that all of his friends, associates, and connections have abandoned him now that he has been left crippled and penniless.

Helen and Orlando argue when he learns she has moved back in with Charles to look after him, and he leaves heartbroken. Charles realizes his mistakes and apologizes to Helen, realizing that she was the only one who truly cared for him. He becomes a kinder man, while she helps him recover. He regains his ability to walk one day in church, where Debrah, now clean and sober after going into rehab, reconciles with Brian.

Charles hopes to start over with Helen, but during a family dinner with Madea, she gives him her wedding ring and signed divorce papers and tells him she will always be his friend. She finds Orlando, asks him to propose again, and accepts when he does.

Cast
 Kimberly Elise as Helen Simmons-McCarter, a woman who is the soon-to-be ex-wife of Charles.
 Steve Harris as Charles McCarter, a successful lawyer.
 Shemar Moore as Orlando, a moving truck driver.
 Cicely Tyson as Myrtle Simmons, Helen's mother.
 Tyler Perry as:
 Mabel "Madea" Simmons, a tough old lady and Helen's grandmother
 Joe Simmons, Madea's brother.
 Brian Simmons, a lawyer who is Madea's nephew and Joe's son.
 Lisa Marcos as Brenda Marcos, Charles' mistress.
 Tamara Taylor as Debrah, Brian's drug-addicted wife.
 Tiffany Evans as Tiffany, Brian's daughter.
 Avery Knight as BJ, Brian's son
 Gary Anthony Sturgis as Jamison Milton Jackson, a career criminal.
 Chandra Currelley as herself 
 Judge Mablean Ephriam as herself
 Tamela Mann as Cora Simmons, a choir member at the church Helen attends who is revealed to be Madea's daughter in other works.

Soundtrack
The soundtrack was released by Motown Records on April 19, 2005.

Release 
The film was released on DVD and VHS June 28, 2005 by Lions Gate Home Entertainment.

Reception

Box office
On its opening weekend, the film arrived at number 1 on the box office rankings, with takings of $21.9 million. The film grossed an estimated $50.6 million in the United States and Canada, with an additional $19,000 internationally, for an estimated worldwide total of $50.7 million.

Critical response
Professional film critics were mostly negative in their evaluation of Diary of a Mad Black Woman. Rotten Tomatoes gives the film a score of 16% based on 115 reviews, with an average rating of 4.0/10. The site's consensus reads "Tyler Perry's successful play can't make the move to the screen; this mix of slapstick, melodrama and spirituality lacks a consistent tone." Metacritic gives the film a weighted average score of 36% based on reviews from 30 critics, which the site considers "generally unfavorable reviews". Audience polled by CinemaScore gave the film a rare "A+" grade, on a scale from A-F.

Roger Ebert gave the film one out of four stars, arguing that the Madea character "is not remotely plausible [and] not merely wrong for the movie, but fatal to it." Ebert also wrote that Elise, Tyson and Harris offered effective performances and that "[t]here's a good movie buried beneath the bad one."

Sequel 
A sequel to the film, Madea's Family Reunion, was released on February 24, 2006.

References

External links
 
 
 

2005 films
2005 comedy-drama films
2005 directorial debut films
American films based on plays
African-American comedy-drama films
Films about adultery in the United States
Films about divorce
Films about lawyers
Films about the upper class
Films directed by Darren Grant
Films set in Georgia (U.S. state)
Films shot in Atlanta
Films with screenplays by Tyler Perry
Lionsgate films
2000s English-language films
2000s American films